Hungry for You is a 1996 American erotic thriller and science fiction film directed by Dimitri Logothetis and produced by Gary Hudson. This film has music composed by Joel Hirschhorn. The film stars: Michael Phenicie, Rochelle Swanson, Gary Wood, Nancy Hochman and Ritchie Montgomery in the lead roles.

Cast
 Michael Phenicie as Rodney
 Rochelle Swanson as Viva
 Gary Wood as Brannagan
 Nancy Hochman as Val
 Ritchie Montgomery as Arnold
 Michael Gregory as Jack
 Johnny Lage as Joe
 Mark Twogood as Bull Rider

References

External links
 

1996 films
1990s science fiction thriller films
1990s erotic thriller films
American science fiction thriller films
American erotic thriller films
1990s English-language films
Films directed by Dimitri Logothetis
1990s American films